Milan Zadel (born 16 April 1930 in Ljubljana) is a retired Yugoslav slalom canoeist who competed in the mid-to-late 1950s. He won a bronze medal in the folding K-1 event at the 1953 ICF Canoe Slalom World Championships in Meran.

References

Living people
1930 births
Yugoslav male canoeists
Medalists at the ICF Canoe Slalom World Championships